The Competitive Network Operators of Canada (CNOC) is an organisation of over 30 independent Canadian telecommunications providers. It often lobbies to the CRTC and other regulatory bodies to represent the interest of its members in matter of high-speed Internet accessibility, VoIP industry regulations, anti-monopoly market competitiveness, and privacy of customer information. CNOC's current president and chairman is Matt Stein, also CEO of Distributel.

Members
, companies which are active CNOC members are:

ACN Canada
B2B2C
City-Wide Communications
Coextro
Distributel
dotmobile
Egate Networks
Execulink Telecom
Fidalia Networks
InnSys
ISP Canada
Kingston Online Services
LOGIX
Odynet
Oricom Internet
Oxio
Packetworks
Rally Internet
Sentex Communications
SkyChoice Communications
Start.ca
Storm Internet
Transat Telecom
VIF Internet
VMedia
VSOFT
The Wire Inc.
Netcrawler

References

External links

Trade associations based in Canada
Telecommunications in Canada